Kattu Paya Sir Intha Kaali also known as Kattu Paiyan Sir Intha Kaali, which was earlier titled as Ketta Paya Sir Intha Kaali ), is a 2018 Indian Tamil language action drama film written and directed by Youreka. The film stars debutant Jaivanth in the male lead role along with Rajasthan based Iraa Agarwal in the female lead role while Aadukalam Naren, Munnar Ramesh play pivotal roles in the film. The film was released on 3 August 2018 and received poor reviews from the audience.<

Plot 
The plot of the film depicts the invasion of North Indian people into Tamil Nadu and about the loan sharks imposed by those people against people of Tamil Nadu.

Cast 

 Jaivanth as Kaali
 Iraa Agarwal as  Amudha Paul, a bubby girl from Madurai
 Aadukalam Naren as a senior police officer
 Munnar Ramesh
 Abhishek Vinod
 G. Marimuthu as a manager
 C. V. Kumar
 Kayal Devaraj as a mentally challenged person
 Seeman

Production 
The production of the film was proceeded by director Youreka, starting from April 2017 initially under the title of Ketta Paya Sir Intha Kaali which was a famous film dialogue of veteran actor Rajinikanth in the 1978 film Mullum Malarum. But earlier in 2017, another production also chose a film title related to the famous dialogue of Rajnikanth which was titled as Ketta Paiyan Sir Ivan. Due to these issues the title was renamed as Kattu Paya Sir Intha Kaali.

The film marks the fourth directorial venture of film director Youreka after Madurai Sambavam (2009), Thoppi (2015) and Sivappu Enakku Pidikkum (2017). The production team hired Jaivanth as a newcomer in the male lead role and also Rajasthan based actress Iraa Agarwal was also roped in to play the female lead role, which was also her second Tamil film after Dhayam.

References

External links 

Indian action drama films
2018 action drama films
2010s Tamil-language films
Indian films about revenge